Richard Campbell Andrew Brandram, MC (5 August 1911 – 28 March 1994) was a major in the British Army who married Princess Katherine of Greece and Denmark in 1947, which united him with most of the royal families in Europe.

Biography 

Richard was born on 5 August 1911 at Bexhill-on-Sea, Sussex, England. Richard's father, Richard Andrew Brandram, head of a landed gentry family, was the founder of the Bickley Park School in Kent, while his mother, Maud Campbell Blaker, was a housewife.

He was educated at Tonbridge School and Pembroke College, Cambridge. He was a keen rugby union player, having played for the University, Blackheath, then one of the top sides in England and he also represented Kent in the county championship. In the summer of 1933 he was part of the Cambridge Vandals combined cricket and rugby tour to Canada and the United States, this was the first ever recorded tour of a British rugby team to either country. Touring as a rugby back division specialist he scored nine tries and was second top scorer.

On 21 April 1947, Richard married Princess Katherine of Greece and Denmark, daughter of King Constantine I of Greece and Princess Sophia of Prussia, in the Royal Palace of Athens. The couple had met in 1946 when Brandram was returning to England from Baghdad on the RMS Ascania. They had one son:

 Richard Paul George Andrew Brandram (1 April 1948 – 9 May 2020); married, firstly, Jennifer Diane Steele (23 August 1951) on 12 February 1975 in London, England. The couple had three children:
 Sophie Eila Brandram (23 January 1981); she married Humphrey Voelcker on 11 February 2017. They have two sons, Maximilian Walter (born 4 February 2018) and Alexander Paul (born 13 May 2019).
 Nicholas George Brandram (b. 23 April 1982); married Katrina Johanne Marie Davis (b. 21 March 1978) on 10 September 2011 and they were divorced in 2014.
 Alexia Katherine Brandram (b. 6 December 1985); married William John Palairet Hicks (b. 14 August 1983) on 29 April 2016 in London, England. The couple has one daughter, Theodora Katherine Anne (born 6 March 2019) and a son, Frederick William Paul (born 21 March 2021).

Paul Brandram married, secondly, Katherine Moreton (b. 1954), on 19 September 2009 at Walton, Warwickshire. The couple had no children.

On 25 August 1947, shortly before Prince Philip, her first cousin once removed was due to marry the future Queen Elizabeth II, King George VI of the United Kingdom granted Princess Katherine the status of the daughter of a duke in the British order of precedence. Brandram and his wife lived in Eaton Square in Belgravia, and later moved to Croft Cottage, Marlow, Buckinghamshire. Katherine Brandram died in 2007.

Richard Brandram died on 28 March 1994, at age 82, after a long illness.

Military career

Having been a cadet company sergeant major in the Tonbridge School Officers' Training Corps, Brandram was commissioned into the Territorial Army as a second lieutenant in the Royal Artillery on 15 July 1939. He served with the artillery during the Second World War, reaching the war substantive rank of captain. On 31 August 1946 he transferred to the Regular Army as a lieutenant in the Royal Artillery, with seniority from 1 August 1938, and was promoted to captain effective from 31 August 1946, with seniority from 5 August 1942. On 5 August 1947 he was promoted to major. On 7 February 1950 he was dismissed from the service by sentence of a general court-martial.

Honours 

On 29 June 1944, Brandram was awarded the Military Cross for "gallant and distinguished services in Italy" during the Second World War. On 20 March 1947 he was awarded the Efficiency Medal (Territorial). This was replaced by the award of the Territorial Efficiency Decoration on 21 April 1950 and his award of the Efficiency Medal consequently cancelled on 24 August 1951, but the award of the TD was also cancelled by forfeiture on 8 May 1953.

References 

1911 births
1994 deaths
People from Bexhill-on-Sea
Royal Artillery officers
People educated at Tonbridge School
Alumni of Pembroke College, Cambridge
Recipients of the Military Cross
British Army personnel of World War II
British Army personnel who were court-martialled
People stripped of a British Commonwealth honour